The 85th Texas Legislature began on January 10, 2017. All members of the House and Senate were elected in the general election held on November 8, 2016.

Party summary

Senate

House of Representatives

Officers

Senate
 Lieutenant Governor: Dan Patrick (R)
 President Pro Tempore: Kel Seliger (R)

House of Representatives
 Speaker of the House: Joe Straus (R)
 Speaker Pro Tempore: Dennis Bonnen (R)

Members

Senate

On February 22, 2018 a jury found Carlos Uresti on 11 Federal Felony charges relating to his alleged involvement in a Ponzi scheme that defrauded investors out of hundreds of thousands of dollars. He resigned 4 months after he was convicted due to pressure from his democratic colleagues.

On October 12, 2018 Pete Flores was sworn in after winning the Texas Senate District 19 special election and special election run off to fill in the vacant seat for Carlos Uresti.

House of Representatives

Notable legislation
Texas Governor Greg Abbott signed Texas Senate Bill 4, which bans sanctuary cities, into law on May 7, 2017.

References

External links 

85 Texas Legislature
2017 in Texas
2017 U.S. legislative sessions